The  is a limited express service operated by Hokkaido Railway Company (JR Hokkaido) between  and  in Hokkaido via the Sekihoku Main Line since 4 March 2017. The Taisetsu train service name was also formerly used for express services operated by Japanese National Railways (JNR) and later by JR Hokkaido from June 1947 until March 1992.

Service outline

Stops
Trains stop at the following stations:

 -  - - -  -  -  -  -  -  - 

Stations in brackets are stations where not all trains stop at.

 Taisetsu no. 2 does not stop at Shirataki.
 Taisetsu no. 4 does not stop at Maruseppu

Rolling stock
Services are normally formed of four-car KiHa 183 series diesel multiple unit (DMU) trains formed as follows. All cars are no-smoking.

History

1947-1963
The train received the name Taisetsu from 1 April 1951.

This service ran until 31 May 1963, after which it was replaced by the Lilac service.

1963-1992

From 1 June 1963, the Taisetsu service operated as an express between Sapporo and Abashiri, via Asahikawa. This service was discontinued from the start of the revised timetable on 14 March 1992.

2017-

References

External links

  

Named passenger trains of Japan
Hokkaido Railway Company
Railway services introduced in 1947
Railway services introduced in 2017

ja:オホーツク (列車)